Sofia Skog (born 1 October 1988) is a Swedish footballer who last played for Kopparbergs/Göteborg FC in the fully professional Damallsvenskan, the top Swedish women's league, as a midfielder. Skog played for Jitex BK from 2010 to 2013, where she scored four goals in 76 appearances.

References

External links
  (archive)
  (archive)
 

1988 births
Swedish women's footballers
Living people
BK Häcken FF players
Jitex BK players
Damallsvenskan players
Women's association football midfielders